The 1985 World Table Tennis Championships women's doubles was the 37th edition of the women's doubles championship.
Geng Lijuan and Dai Lili defeated Cao Yanhua and Ni Xialian in the final by two sets to nil.

The championships matches were best of three sets.

Results

See also
List of World Table Tennis Championships medalists

References

-
1985 in women's table tennis